Sclerotheca is a genus of plants native to various islands in the South Pacific. Nine of the ten known species are French Polynesia, the tenth to Rarotonga in the Cook Islands.

Sclerotheca arborea (G.Forst.) DC - Tahiti
Sclerotheca forsteri Drake - Moorea, Tahiti
Sclerotheca jayorum J.Raynal - Tahiti
Sclerotheca longistigmata F.Br. - Marquesas
Sclerotheca margaretae R.Br. - Rapa
Sclerotheca magdalenae J.Florence - Tahiti
Sclerotheca oreades E.Willm. - Tahiti
Sclerotheca raiateensis (Baill.) Pillon & Florence - Raiatea
Sclerotheca seigelii (Florence) Pillon & Florence - Marquesas
Sclerotheca viridiflora Cheeseman - Rarotonga

References

Lobelioideae
Campanulaceae genera